The Proud One is the seventh studio album released by The Osmonds in 1975. Two singles, "The Proud One" and "I'm Still Gonna Need You" were released from the album. The album peaked at No. 160 on the Billboard Top LPs chart, a precipitous drop from their previous albums.

The title track gave the quintet its last top 40 hit in the US to date as well as its first and only number-one on the easy listening charts. "I'm Still Gonna Need You" did not make the Billboard Hot 100 but did make the top 40 in the UK and appeared on the easy listening charts.

The UK version of the album, released with the same tracks but under the title I'm Still Gonna Need You, reached No. 19 on the UK Albums Chart, their last studio album to make an appearance on the chart.

Track listing

Charts

Certifications

References

External links
http://osmondmania.com/Discography2/Album_Pages/ProudOne.html

The Osmonds albums
1975 albums
Albums produced by Mike Curb
MGM Records albums